Magnus O'Donnell (q4 1882 – after 1906) was an English footballer who scored 13 goals from 64 appearances in the Football League playing for Lincoln City and Barnsley. He played as an inside left. He also played non-league football for Wallsend Park Villa, Newark Town, Grantham Avenue and Castleford Town.

References

1882 births
Year of death missing
People from Willington Quay
Footballers from Tyne and Wear
English footballers
Association football inside forwards
Lincoln City F.C. players
Barnsley F.C. players
Newark Town F.C. players
Castleford Town F.C. players
English Football League players
Grantham Avenue F.C. players